Bruce Van Dyke  (born August 6, 1944) is a former American football guard who played eleven seasons in the National Football League (NFL) for the Philadelphia Eagles, Pittsburgh Steelers, and the Green Bay Packers.

Early years
Van Dyke grew up in Buckner, Missouri, and attended Fort Osage High School in Independence, Missouri.  He played college football at the University of Missouri, where he was a two way starter, playing on both the offensive and defensive lines under head coach Dan Devine.  As a first-team All-Big Eight Conference defensive tackle in 1965, Van Dyke played on Tigers teams that went a combined 21–8–2 from 1963 to 1965.  The 1965 Missouri squad, on which he served as a captain, finished the year ranked sixth nationally, with a win over the Florida in the 1966 Sugar Bowl.  Van Dyke was selected to play in the Hula Bowl in 1966, and was inducted into the University of Missouri's Intercollegiate Hall of Fame in 2001.

Professional career
Van Dyke was selected in the 12th round of the 1966 NFL Draft by the Philadelphia Eagles and in the 15th round of the 1966 AFL Draft by the Kansas City Chiefs.  He signed with the Eagles and played there his rookie year.  The following season he was traded to the Pittsburgh Steelers where he played right guard for the next seven seasons.  His first year with the Steelers the team had won only one game.  In 1972 Pittsburgh finished the season with an 11–3 record and won the AFC Central title.  In week 8 of the 1972 Steelers season Van Dyke was named A.P. Offensive player of the week after a 40–17 win over the Cincinnati Bengals.  That same year the Steelers made their first playoff appearance since the 1947 season and won their first franchise playoff game beating the Oakland Raiders 13–7.  During that game, one of the most memorable plays in both Van Dyke's career and NFL history occurred.  Trailing 7–6 with 22 seconds left in the game, Franco Harris scored the winning touchdown on the final play of the game.  This play, of course, is known as the Immaculate Reception.  In 1974, Van Dyke was traded to the Green Bay Packers, where he was reunited with his former college coach Dan Devine.  While in Green Bay, he switched to left guard and retired from football after the 1976 season. In 2008, Van Dyke was named to the Pittsburgh Steelers Legends team.

References

1944 births
Living people
American football offensive guards
Green Bay Packers players
Missouri Tigers football players
Philadelphia Eagles players
Pittsburgh Steelers players
American Conference Pro Bowl players
Sportspeople from Independence, Missouri
People from Lancaster, California
Players of American football from Missouri
People from Jackson County, Missouri